Mimoleiopus sumatranus is a species of beetle in the family Cerambycidae, and the only species in the genus Mimoleiopus. It was described by Breuning in 1969.

References

Acanthocinini
Beetles described in 1969
Monotypic beetle genera